Cem Yılmaz (born June 3, 1982) is a Turkish Olympian rower, currently competing for Galatasaray Rowing.

He was part of the Turkish men's eight rowing team, which won the bronze medal at the 2014 World Rowing Championships held Bosbaan, Amsterdam, the Netherlands.

References

1982 births
Sportspeople from Istanbul
Turkish male rowers
Galatasaray Rowing rowers
Rowers at the 2016 Summer Olympics
Olympic rowers of Turkey
Living people
World Rowing Championships medalists for Turkey